Goldbach is a river of Hesse, Germany. It is a tributary of the Eder in Röddenau, district of Frankenberg.

As the name suggests, gold was found in the river.

See also
List of rivers of Hesse

Rivers of Hesse
Rivers of Germany